Peter Harness (born 1976) is an English playwright, screenwriter and actor. He has contributed to programmes such as McMafia, City of Vice and Case Histories.

Early life
He grew up in Hornsea, East Yorkshire and attended Oriel College, Oxford where he studied English. He is a former president of the Oxford Revue. He was one of Screen International's Stars of Tomorrow, 2007 and is a recipient of the Dennis Potter Screenwriting Award.

Early works
Mongoose, his first original stage play, was performed at the Southwark Playhouse in 2003 (directed by Thea Sharrock) and later at the Assembly Rooms, Edinburgh and the Trafalgar Studios, London.  The text is published by Nick Hern Books.

In 2005, he adapted the M.R. James short story "A View From A Hill" for BBC4. It was the first in a new annual series of BBC Ghost Stories for Christmas. Harness went on to write several other single films for BBC4, including a biopic of Frankie Howerd, Rather You Than Me, starring David Walliams and Rafe Spall, which was part of the Curse of Comedy season, as well as the Spanish flu drama, The Forgotten Fallen, starring Bill Paterson, Mark Gatiss and Charlotte Riley, which dealt with the efforts of a medical team in Manchester to combat the disease in 1918.

Career
Harness was the lead writer of the third and fourth seasons of the BBC's Wallander, starring Kenneth Branagh. He wrote all of season three, comprising three films: The Dogs of Riga, Before the Frost, and a new story developed by Henning Mankell and Harness called An Event in Autumn. He wrote two out of three films for season four, A Lesson in Love and The Troubled Man, and was executive producer for the series as a whole.

Aside from Wallander, Harness has worked on several other successful series.  City of Vice, starring Ian McDiarmid and Iain Glen, was shown on Channel Four to critical acclaim. Harness (along with co-writer Clive Bradley) was nominated for a Writers Guild of Great Britain Award for Best Series. In 2011, he adapted Kate Atkinson's novel When Will There Be Good News? as part of the BBC1 series Case Histories, starring Jason Isaacs as private detective Jackson Brodie. Harness's episodes of the series won a Scottish BAFTA for Best Television Drama, 2011. Harness also adapted the fourth Jackson Brodie book, Started Early, Took My Dog for the second series of Case Histories, which filmed in Summer 2012.

His first original screenplay, Is Anybody There? was filmed by award-winning Irish director John Crowley in 2007. The movie, set in an old people's home, starred Michael Caine, David Morrissey, Anne-Marie Duff and Bill Milner. It was premiered at the Toronto International Film Festival, 2008, and released theatrically across Europe and the US in 2009. Harness was nominated for a Writers Guild Award for the film.

He adapted Susanna Clarke's novel Jonathan Strange and Mr Norrell into a 2015 television series of the same name.

In 2014 he wrote the seventh episode for the eighth series of Doctor Who, "Kill the Moon", starring Peter Capaldi as the Twelfth Doctor. In 2015, wrote a 2-part story titled "The Zygon Invasion" and "The Zygon Inversion" (the latter co-written with Steven Moffat) for the ninth series of Doctor Who. Harness novelised these episodes as part of the Target Collection. He also co-wrote the seventh episode of the tenth series with Moffat, titled "The Pyramid at the End of the World".

In 2018, Harness wrote for the crime drama series McMafia, about the Russian Mafia. In 2019, he wrote a new miniseries adaptation of The War of the Worlds for BBC One, produced by Mammoth Screen. On April 6, 2022, it was announced Apple TV+ had greenlit Harness' conspiracy thriller series Constellation.

Other projects
He has also been active in the Malmö theatre community as part of the theatre group Teater Insite both as an actor and a writer.

References

External links

1976 births
Living people
People from Hornsea
British television writers
British science fiction writers
English television writers
English screenwriters
English male screenwriters
English male dramatists and playwrights
English dramatists and playwrights
English male stage actors
Alumni of Oriel College, Oxford
British male television writers